Cuisset is a surname. Notable people with the surname include:

Frank Frederick Cuisset (1812–1891), English composer and organist
Paul Cuisset (born 1964), French programmer and video game designer
Thibaut Cuisset (1958–2017), French photographer